Appleton is a civil parish in the Borough of Warrington, Cheshire, England. It contains 25 buildings that are recorded in the National Heritage List for England as designated listed buildings. The parish is partly residential, including the village of Appleton Thorn, and is otherwise mainly rural. The Bridgewater Canal runs along its northern border, the A49 road is to the west, and the M6 motorway is to the east. Most of the listed buildings are residential, are related to farming, or are associated with the canal and roads in the parish. The exceptions to this are the village church, a war memorial, an obelisk, and a Medieval cross base.

Key

Listed buildings

See also
Listed buildings in Antrobus
Listed buildings in Grappenhall and Thelwall
Listed buildings in Hatton
Listed buildings in High Legh
Listed buildings in Lymm
Listed buildings in Stockton Heath
Listed buildings in Stretton
Listed buildings in Walton

References
Citations

Sources

Listed buildings in Warrington
Lists of listed buildings in Cheshire